Vennture Brew Company is a microbrewery and coffee shop in Milwaukee, Wisconsin, United States, that opened in 2018. Vennture was created by three photographers who turned their hobby projects in coffee and beer into a successful business; in 2022, Yelp listed them as the best brewery in the state of Wisconsin. Headquartered in a former hardware store, they are known for their "The Heights" saison. It is one of a small minority of US breweries that are partly or wholly Black-owned.

History 

Vennture Brew Company was founded by Simon McConico, Robert Gustafson, and Jake Rohde, all photographers linked by a preexisting friendship. Their inspiration for a combined specialty coffee shop and brewery came while on trips to the US states of Colorado, Minnesota, Illinois, Michigan, and elsewhere in Wisconsin. They learned that the two beverages share similar clientele despite being primarily consumed at different times of the day. Their experiences flowed into the unusual spelling of "venture", with two n's, and the company's Venn diagram-esque logo; McConico, Gustafson, and Rohde wanted to exist at the intersection of "coffee, beer, and community".

To create the business, the three owners brought their experience in hobby projects: Rohde had become consumed with the intricacies of roasting coffee, while McConico and Gustafson had been homebrewing for years. Transitioning to a commercial scale required a lengthy business plan, and to learn the fine details of running a hospitality business McConico took a job at a nearby taproom. 

Vennture opened in July 2018, supported by $22,000 of funding raised in a Kickstarter campaign. Vennture's opening meant that it joined the less-than one percent of US breweries to be wholly or partly Black-owned. McConico would later tell the Milwaukee Business Journal:

In 2022, Yelp named it as the top brewery in the state of Wisconsin. By then, it had become part of a slew of breweries located along a North Avenue corridor in Milwaukee and nearby Wauwatosa.

Location 
Vennture's only location is in Milwaukee, Wisconsin, at 5519 North Avenue. The location straddles the city's Uptown Crossing and Washington Heights neighborhoods; news sources have placed it in both. , all three owners lived within seven blocks of the building.

McConico, Gustafson, and Rohde leased the space in February 2017 and converted it to its present use over 18 months. It was previously divided into two storefronts that contained various businesses over time, including a hardware store. The primary colors used inside are blue and white, and the bar is constructed from upcycled hardwood floors. Milwaukee Magazine has described Vennture's location as "a bright, welcoming spot ... with a friendly, and family friendly, neighborhood vibe."

Beer 
Vennture's flagship beer is called "The Heights," a table saison named after the neighborhood in which the brewery resides. It has been brewed since the shop opened. On Vennture Brew's opening day, six beers were available on tap, along with coffee- and espresso-based drinks as well as tea sourced from a company in Madison, Wisconsin.

See also 
List of breweries in Wisconsin

References

External links 

Beer brewing companies based in Wisconsin
Food and drink companies established in 2018
American companies established in 2018